Moron 5 and the Crying Lady is a 2012 Filipino comedy film directed by Wenn V. Deramas, starring Luis Manzano, DJ Durano, Martin Escudero, Billy Crawford, Marvin Agustin, and John Lapus. It was released on April 7, 2012, and was distributed by Viva Films. A sequel, Moron 5.2: The Transformation, was released on November 5, 2014.

It tells the story of five friends who are depicted to be stupid. They cross paths with a woman (Lapus) who has a grudge against them, so much that the woman, will do anything to bring them down.

Plot

Half-witted longtime friends Albert (Luis Manzano), Isaac (Billy Crawford), Mozart "Mo" (DJ Durano), Michaelangelo "Mike" (Martin Escudero) and  Aristotle "Aris" (Marvin Agustin) were used to living moronic yet pretty normal and hassle-free lives until successful careerwoman Beckie Pamintuan (John Lapus) accused them of killing her father and ruin everything for them. The Moron 5 are more than sure of their innocence but for the life of them, they can't find any single satisfactory argument on how to prove it especially when their opponent would do everything to punish them for whim. Spending three miserable years in prison trying different failed comedic attempts to get out, they finally figured a way to escape. They stalked Beckie and tried to understand why she's fighting so hard to have them imprisoned when it's clear as day that what happened three years ago was a nonsense frame-up. An opportunity came when Beckie's driver got fired for having an affair with her maid and Albert volunteered to apply to replace him. He infiltrated the Pamintuan Residence and together with his four crazily daft friends, they've gathered information about the curious family yet to them, it isn't making any sense at all especially Becky's unexplained hatred to the five of them. Why is Beckie fighting so hard to have them suffer? The Moron 5 will try harder to know and hopefully understand what's really going on although little did they know that by doing so, everything that they hold dear might be at risk.

Cast

Luis Manzano as Albert Macapagal
Billy Crawford as Isaac Estrada
Marvin Agustin as Aristotle Ramos
DJ Durano as Mozart Twister Aquino
Mart Escudero as Michael Angelo Marcos
John Lapus as Beckie Pamintuan
Roden Araneta† as Albert's father
Carlos Agassi as Alding Cabalda (Bully 1)
German Moreno† as Isaac's father		
Dennis Padilla as Michael's father		
Arlene Muhlach as Isaac's mother	
Deborah Sun as Mozart's mother	
Jon Santos as Albert's mother		
Roldan Aquino as Mozart's father		
Joy Viado† as Filomena Gaborone (Aristotle's aunt)
Flora Gasser† as Albert's yaya
Eagle Riggs as Principal
Christopher Roxas as Elmer Despa (Bully 2)
Andrew Wolfe as Carding		
Tess Antonio as Teacher 1		
Dang Cruz as Teacher 2	
Aki Torio as Issac's brother
Eri Neeman as Ricardo Salvador (Bully 3)
Nikki Gil as Bank Teller (Cameo)
Jennylyn Mercado as Prison Visitor (Cameo)
Ya Chang as Hiroshi (Beckie's fiancée)
Mark Andrew Felix as Young Albert
Marco Barillo as Young Isaac
Carlos Dala as Young Aristotle
Kevin Kier Remo as Young Mozart
Martin Luigie Venegas as Young Mike
Kyle Ang as Young Beckie
Ate Glow as inmate in a wheelchair

Sequel

A sequel, Moron 5.2: The Transformation, was released on November 5, 2014. All lead stars but one reprised their roles in the original movie. Matteo Guidicelli joined the cast as Michael Angelo, replacing Martin Escudero. In an interview from Viva Entertainment YouTube Video, Guidicelli stressed that the character's (previously played by Escudero) face was accidentally burnt. His face was surgically restored in the story, following Guidicelli's face. The theatrical release was on November 5, 2014.

Filming
The filming began in December 2011 and wrapped up in January 2012.

References

External links

2012 films
Cultural depictions of Gloria Macapagal Arroyo
Films directed by Wenn V. Deramas
2010s Japanese-language films
2010s coming-of-age comedy films
Philippine coming-of-age comedy films
2010s Tagalog-language films
Viva Films films
2010s English-language films